is a railway station in the city of  Toyohashi, Aichi Prefecture, Japan, operated by the Public–private partnership Toyohashi Railroad.

Lines
Aichidaigakumae Station is a station of the Atsumi Line, and is located 2.5 kilometers from the starting point of the line at Shin-Toyohashi Station.

Station layout
The station has one side platform serving a single bi-directional track. The station is staffed.

Adjacent stations

|-
!colspan=5|Toyohashi Railroad

Station history
The station name, meaning "Division entrance", derived from its proximity to the main gate of the Imperial Japanese Army, originally garrisoned by the 15th Division. The station was closed on June 5, 1944.

The station name changed to its present name on January 29, 2005.

Passenger statistics
In fiscal 2017, the station was used by an average of 5273 passengers daily.

Surrounding area
Japan National Route 259
Aichi University

See also
 List of railway stations in Japan

References

External links

Toyohashi Railway Official home page

Railway stations in Aichi Prefecture
Railway stations in Japan opened in 1924
Toyohashi